Alabama Baptist may refer to:
Alabama Baptist Convention, a church organization
The Alabama Baptist, a weekly newspaper
History of Baptists in Alabama